Marko Kilpi (born 19 May 1969 in Rovaniemi) is a Finnish politician currently serving in the Parliament of Finland for the National Coalition Party at the Savonia-Karelia constituency.

References

1969 births
Living people
People from Rovaniemi
National Coalition Party politicians
Members of the Parliament of Finland (2019–23)
Finnish crime writers
Writers from Lapland (Finland)